That Certain Something is a 1941 Australian musical film directed by Clarence G. Badger and starring Megan Edwards and Thelma Grigg. The plot concerns an American film director who decides to make a musical in Australia. It was the last film directed by Badger, a noted silent era director.

Plot
A famous director, Robert Grimble, comes to Australia to make a film about pioneering women and seeks for an unknown to play the lead role. He casts socialist Miss Hemingway, who soon proves to be temperamental. She is tricked into walking off the job by Jimmie Jones who wants his girlfriend Patsy cast. He succeeds and Patsy becomes a star.

Cast

Megan Edwards as Patsy O'Connell
Thelma Grigg as Miss Hemmingway
Georgie Stirling as Blanche Wright
Lou Vernon as Robert Grimble
Charles Kilburn as Allan Burke
Joe Lawman as Bill Lake
Howard Craven as Jimmie Jones
Ronald Morse as Marcel du Bois
Leslie Victor as Maurice Appleby
Marshall Crosby
Connie Martyn
Raymond Longford
Ross Vernon
William Beresford
John Byrne
Arundel Nixon
Francis Birtles as bushman

Production
The film was the first from Argosy Films and was made with the assistance of a bank overdraft from the New South Wales government. It was directed by Clarence Badger, a Hollywood director who had retired to Australia. The original title was Daughters of Australia.

Megan Edwards had only appeared in a few stage shows before being cast in the lead. She later received a three-year contract from a Hollywood manager.

The seven-week shoot took place at Pagewood Studios, the first movie made there in three years. The colonial sequence was especially researched. The camera crew included notable cameraman John Howes, who died aged 29.

Release
Despite securing distribution from RKO, reception to the film from critics and the public was poor.

References

External links
That Certain Something in the Internet Movie Database
That Certain Something at Oz Movies

1941 films
Australian musical drama films
Films directed by Clarence G. Badger
1941 musical films
Australian black-and-white films
1940s English-language films
1940s Australian films